Vengeful Ascension is the seventh studio album by blackened death metal band Goatwhore, released on June 23, 2017 by Metal Blade Records. This was the last album to feature bassist James Harvey, who departed the same year.

In addition to the standard release, a special "Spell Book" edition was also released, limited to 3000 copies. This edition includes a 40-page hardcover book containing lyrics and imagery relating to the album, the album itself on CD, and a bonus CD containing 13 additional tracks featuring several live recordings, cover songs, etc.

Track listing

Bonus CD (included in the limited edition "Spell Book" release)

Personnel
 L. Ben Falgoust II – lead vocals
 Sammy Duet – guitars, backing vocals
 James Harvey – bass
 Zack Simmons – drums

References

2017 albums
Goatwhore albums
Metal Blade Records albums